The enzyme benzoin aldolase catalyzes the chemical reaction

2-hydroxy-1,2-diphenylethanone  2 benzaldehyde

This enzyme belongs to the family of lyases, specifically the aldehyde-lyases, which cleave carbon-carbon bonds.  The systematic name of this enzyme class is 2-hydroxy-1,2-diphenylethanone benzaldehyde-lyase (benzaldehyde-forming)—the systematic name of benzoin is 2-hydroxy-1,2-diphenylethanone. Other names in common use include benzaldehyde lyase, and 2-hydroxy-1,2-diphenylethanone benzaldehyde-lyase.  It employs one cofactor, thiamin diphosphate.

Structural studies

References

 
 

EC 4.1.2
Thiamine enzymes
Enzymes of known structure